Red Rock Ridge or Morro Roca Roja or Promontorio Roca Roja is a conspicuous reddish-colored ridge or promontory which rises to 690 m and projects from the west coast of Graham Land between Neny Fjord and Rymill Bay. Red Rock Ridge was surveyed in 1936 by the British Graham Land Expedition (BGLE) under John Riddoch Rymill, who so named it because of its color. Further surveys in 1948 by the Falkland Islands Dependencies Survey (FIDS) have identified this ridge as the feature first sighted in 1909 and named "Île Pavie" or "Cap Pavie" by the French Antarctic Expedition under Jean-Baptiste Charcot, but the name Red Rock Ridge is now too firmly established to alter.

External links

Headlands of Graham Land
Ridges of Graham Land
Fallières Coast